Bembe  is a town and municipality in Uíge Province in Angola. The municipality had a population of 32,955 in 2014.

In the mid-19th century Bembe was a center of mining by the Portuguese colonial government and one of the points of contract with the rulers of the Kingdom of Kongo.

References

Populated places in Uíge Province
Municipalities of Angola